Stefan Soroka (born November 13, 1951) is a Canadian prelate of the Ukrainian Greek Catholic Church (UGCC). He served as Archbishop of Philadelphia and Metropolitan of the UGCC in the United States from 2000 to 2018.

He was born to Ivan (1920–1993) and Anna (née Galek, 1920–1973) Soroka in Winnipeg, Manitoba, where his family had immigrated that exact same year. After studying at the Catholic University of America, the University of Manitoba, and St. Josaphat Seminary, Soroka was ordained to the priesthood by Archbishop Maxim Hermaniuk, C.Ss.R., on June 13, 1982. He then served as Vice-Chancellor (1985–1994) and Chancellor (1994–1996) of Winnipeg, along with doing pastoral work.

On March 29, 1996, Soroka was appointed Titular Bishop of Acarassus and Auxiliary Bishop and Vicar General of Winnipeg. He received his episcopal consecration on the following June 13 from Archbishop Michael Bzdel, C.Ss.R., with Bishops Cornelius Pasichny, OSBM, and Wolodymyr Paska serving as co-consecrators, in the Cathedral of Ss. Vladimir and Olga.

Soroka was named the sixth Archbishop of Philadelphia on November 29, 2000, and was installed as such on February 27, 2001. In this capacity, he was the head of the Ukrainian Catholic Church in Philadelphia, which is in full communion with the Holy See. Pope Francis accepted his resignation for medical reasons on April 16, 2018.

He obtained his baccalaureate in theology from the CUA in May 1982, and his master's in social work from the University of Manitoba in May 1973.

See also
 

 Catholic Church hierarchy
 Catholic Church in the United States
 Historical list of the Catholic bishops of the United States
 List of Catholic bishops of the United States
 Lists of patriarchs, archbishops, and bishops

Notes

External links

 Ukrainian Catholic Archeparchy of Philadelphia Official Site

Episcopal succession

1951 births
Living people
People from Winnipeg
Bishops in Pennsylvania
American Eastern Catholic bishops
Catholic University of America alumni
Canadian people of Ukrainian descent
Canadian members of the Ukrainian Greek Catholic Church
Eastern Catholic archeparchs in North America
Archbishops of the Ukrainian Greek Catholic Church